is a railway station located in Yahatanishi-ku, Kitakyūshū.

Lines 

Chikuhō Electric Railroad
Chikuhō Electric Railroad Line

Platforms

Adjacent stations

Surrounding area
 7-Eleven
 Katsuki Central Park
 Kusukita Complex
 Katsuki Post Office
 Katsuki Elementary School
 Fukuoka Prefectural Route 61

Railway stations in Fukuoka Prefecture
Railway stations in Japan opened in 1958